The Karaka Million refers to two major New Zealand horse races for young horses - the original Karaka Million for two-year-old (2YO) horses and the Karaka Million 3YO Classic that started in 2018. Held at Ellerslie Racecourse, they are New Zealand's richest races, with a stake of NZ$1,000,000 each.  The races are restricted to horses sold through the New Zealand Bloodstock Yearling Sales held at Karaka. The two $1,000,000 races are held on the eve of the National Yearling Sales Series at Karaka.

History

The 2YO race was run for the first time in 2008, replacing a similar race held at Te Rapa. Up to 2017, horses eligible for the Karaka Million could also be entered in an associated race, the Karaka Three Year Old Mile over 1600m (NZ$200,000), in the following year. However, from 2018 New Zealand Bloodstock introduced a second Magic Million $1,000,000 race for three-year-olds.

Whereas a usual New Zealand race meeting may start before 1pm, have up to 10 races, and finish before 6pm the Karaka Million race meeting is a twilight meeting.  For example, 2023 had a six-race card:

 4:09pm - the Karaka Cup, 2200m open handicap for a stake of $120,000
 4:48pm - the Group 2 Westbury Classic, 1400m set weights + penalties for fillies and mares for $180,000 
 5:28pm - the Group 3 Almanzor Trophy, 1200m 3YO set weight + penalties for $130,000
 6:08pm - the listed Karaka Million 2YO, 1200m set weight for $1,000,000
 6:48pm - the Group 3 Concorde Handicap, 1200m Open Handicap for $130,000
 7:28pm - the listed Karaka Million 3YO Classic, 1600m set weight for $1,000,000
 
Since 2018, the "Boys Get Paid" Facebook group have organized a large gathering of hundreds of members at the Karaka Million meeting with a punting syndicate delivering what are believed to be the largest bets on New Zealand races.

Winners of the Karaka Million 2YO

These are the recent winners of the Karaka Million 2YO race:

Melody Belle was a $32 outsider when she won the 2017 edition.

Avantage, Melody Belle and The Heckler also won the Manawatu Sires Produce Stakes.

The victory by Cool Aza Beel in 2020 was the fourth consecutive win by Opie Bosson as a jockey in the Karaka Million 2YO race. He did not ride in the 2021 edition but was successful again in 2022 with Dynastic.

The 2022 victory of Dynastic was the sixth consecutive win by Jamie Richards as a trainer/co-trainer in the race.

Winners of the Karaka Million 3YO Classic

The following are the recent winners of the Karaka Million 3YO Classic raced over 1600m.

The 2018 and 2022 Karaka Million 3YO winners Scott Base and Pin Me Up were $22.10 and $24.10 outsiders respectively.

Winners of the Karaka 3YO Mile

2017 - Volpe Veloce 
2016 - Raghu 
2015 - Volkstok'n'barrell 
2014 - Spellbinder 
2013 - Choice Bro 
2012 - Rock 'n' Pop
2011 - Banchee
2010 - Joey Massino

Winners of the Karaka Cup

From 2018, the $100,000 Karaka Cup allows older horses to enter for the duration of their careers.

The following are the recent winners of the Karaka Cup raced over 2200m.

August Edition, the 2018 winner of the Karaka Cup was a $30.60 outsider.

Winners of the Karaka Stayers Cup

2017 - Chenille 
2016 - Rose of Virginia 
2015 - Candle in the Wind 
2014 - Deane Martin

See also
 Thoroughbred racing in New Zealand
 New Zealand Derby
 Manawatu Sires Produce Stakes
 New Zealand 1000 Guineas
 New Zealand 2000 Guineas
 New Zealand Oaks
 Levin Classic
 New Zealand Racing Hall of Fame

References

Horse races in New Zealand